CD3 or CD-3 may refer to:
 CD3, or 2020 CD3, a small minimoon of Earth
 CD3 (immunology), an antigen, cluster of differentiation protein (immunology), part of the T cell receptor (TCR) complex on a mature T lymphocyte
 Cost of delay (CD3 Prioritisation), an approach for scheduling work through a scarce resource that maximises Return on Investment. (CD3 = CDx3 from Cost of Delay Divided by Duration).
 Ford CD3 platform
 MediaMax CD-3, copy protection scheme
 MiniCD, a 3-inch CD
 3-inch CD single
 Color Developing Agent 3, the color developer for E-6 process and VNF-1 process.